Jaime King (born April 23, 1979) is an American actress and model. In her modeling career and early film roles, she used the names Jamie King and James King, which was a childhood nickname given to King by her parents, because her agency already represented another Jaime—the older, then-more famous model Jaime Rishar.

A successful model, King was discovered at age 14 in 1993 and appeared in Vogue, Mademoiselle and Harper's Bazaar, among other fashion magazines. From 1998, she moved into acting, taking small film roles. Her first major role was in Pearl Harbor (2001) and her first starring movie role was in Bulletproof Monk (2003). She has since appeared in other films including Sin City (2005) and My Bloody Valentine 3D (2009) and, from 2011 to 2015, starred in the television series Hart of Dixie.  In 2016, she had the lead role in The Mistletoe Promise, a Hallmark movie. She also voiced the role of Aurra Sing on Star Wars: The Clone Wars.

Early life
King was born on April 23, 1979 in the suburbs of Omaha, Nebraska, the daughter of Nancy King, a former beauty queen, and Robert King. She has an older sister Sandi, an older sister Barry and a younger brother Robert (Robbie). King was named after Lindsay Wagner's character, Jaime Sommers, on the 1970s television series The Bionic Woman. King's parents separated in 1994. King had attended Nancy Bounds' Studios, a modeling school, and in 1995 dropped out of Westside High School in order to pursue a modeling career in New York City.  She later enrolled in a home-study program run by the University of Nebraska.

Modeling career 
King was discovered in November 1993, at age 14, while attending Nancy Bounds' Studios. After being spotted at her graduation fashion show by model agent Michael Flutie, King was invited to New York City to begin modeling professionally. She joined Company Management, which already represented Jaime Rishar, a more established model. To avoid confusion, King opted to use her childhood nickname, James, for the duration of her modeling career and later, at the beginning of her film career. In March 1994, she traveled to New York for test pictures and received enthusiastic responses, however, she did not return to New York until July 1994, after gaining a successful advertisement for Abercrombie & Fitch. Much of fall and spring 1994 were spent commuting between Omaha and New York.

King had a successful early career as a fashion model, and by age 15 she had been featured in the fashion magazines Vogue, Mademoiselle, Allure, and Seventeen. At sixteen, King had graced the pages of Glamour and Harper's Bazaar. She was featured in the cover story of the New York Times Magazine published on February 4, 1996, and had walked the runway for Chanel, Alexander McQueen and Christian Dior. In 1998, she began co-hosting MTV's fashion series, House of Style, with fellow model turned actress Rebecca Romijn. Despite her success, King noted that she "remember[s] the times where I was so alone" and thought she was "never gonna be able to be a kid."

In 2004, King, along with Halle Berry, Julianne Moore, and Eva Mendes was chosen as a spokesmodel for a high-profile ad campaign for Revlon. The advertisements were featured in print, television, theatrical, outdoor and Internet venues, banking on their spokeswomen's "collective star power" to sell the cosmetics products. In 2006, King was chosen by Rocawear CEO Jay-Z to become the new face of the line; her advertisements were featured for the winter 2006 season.

Acting career

Early work (1998–2004) 
In 1999, King began her acting career and made her debut in the Daniel Waters' comedy Happy Campers, as Pixel. Happy Campers was screened at the Sundance Film Festival in 2001, and in 2003, King was nominated for Best Actress at the DVD Exclusive Awards. Filmed in 1999, she also appeared in Filter's music video for "Take a Picture". Following her debut acting roles, King appeared briefly in the film Blow, portraying the adult Kristina Jung, daughter of cocaine smuggler George Jung (portrayed by Johnny Depp).

King made her first appearance in a large Hollywood production with her role as a nurse, Betty Bayer, in the World War II epic romance Pearl Harbor (2001). Peter Travers of Rolling Stone magazine commented that King "has a lively minute or two" in the film, but her part was small and the "young cast is mostly pinup packaging". King went on to be featured in the Incubus music video "Wish You Were Here". The roles King took part in during 2001 garnered her the "New Stylemaker" title at the Young Hollywood Awards.

In 2002, she appeared in the teen comedy Slackers as Angela Patton, Four Faces of God as Sam, and the crime comedy Lone Star State of Mind as Baby. Slackers received negative responses from critics, including one who found that the characters "are not so strikingly original as to elevate the slack material", while Four Faces of God and Lone Star State of Mind did not have wide theatrical releases. 2003 saw King in the film Bulletproof Monk, alongside Chow Yun-fat and Seann William Scott, an adaptation of a comic book by Michael Avon Oeming. After five auditions, a screen test, and a physical test, she landed the role of Jade, a character skilled in martial arts. This was King's first leading action film role. Bulletproof Monk received mostly negative reviews from critics, who cited that the fight scenes were not as well choreographed or directed as those other genre films, and that the alternating comedic and action scenes were jarring. Regardless, Bulletproof Monk was nominated for Choice Movie in a Drama/Action Adventure award at the Teen Choice Awards. In late 2003, King appeared in the music video for the Robbie Williams song, "Sexed Up", and on the cover artwork for the single's release. In 2004, she appeared in the comedy White Chicks, playing Heather Vandergeld, with actress Brittany Daniel as her sister Megan Vandergeld, a parody on socialites Paris and Nicky Hilton. White Chicks was negatively reviewed by critics, receiving five nominations at the Razzie Awards in the categories for Worst Actress, Worst Director, Worst Picture, Worst Screen Couple and Worst Screenplay. However, White Chicks won Outstanding Directing for a Box Office Movie and Outstanding Writing for a Box Office Movie at the BET Comedy Awards.

Breakthrough (2005–08) 
In 2005, King appeared in a variety of film and television roles. She first appeared in the independent black comedy and satire Pretty Persuasion, playing a small role as Kathy Joyce, the stepmother of Evan Rachel Wood's character. King landed dual roles (as twins) in the film adaptation of Frank Miller's graphic novel Sin City. She had met with director Robert Rodriguez, who was a fan of her work, and at the time King was unaware that Rodriguez wanted her involved in the film. Eventually, "we started reading [the Sin City graphic novel], and it was really fun". King portrayed Goldie and Wendy, the twin prostitutes in charge of the girls of Old Town, in the segment The Hard Goodbye opposite Mickey Rourke. Sin City featured a large ensemble cast of well-known actors which included Rosario Dawson and Jessica Alba, with whom King "kinda grew up together" in New York.

In Sin City, King was one of the few in the black and white film to have color, that being, red lips and blonde hair when acting as Goldie. The film was screened at the 2005 Cannes Film Festival in-competition and won the Technical Grand Prize for the film's "visual shaping." The family comedy Cheaper by the Dozen 2 featured King as Anne Murtaugh in another large ensemble cast. She also acted in the Al Pacino drama Two for the Money as Alexandria. Both films had negative critical and box office reception.

On television, she had a guest appearance on the teen drama The O.C. and a recurring role on the short-lived situation comedy Kitchen Confidential. King was featured in the Zach Braff-directed music video for Gavin Degraw's "Chariot".

In 2006, King appeared with a small role as Heather in the comedy The Alibi and a starring role in the thriller True True Lie. Her largest role that year was in the David Arquette horror film The Tripper as Samantha. King had a recurring role on the short lived comedy The Class, which ended its run on television after an announcement in May 2007. The Class had been nominated for an Emmy Award in 2007, and it won the People's Choice Award for Favorite New TV Comedy.

In 2007, King filmed They Wait, a horror-thriller film inspired by true events, with Terry Chen as her husband and Regan Oey as their son. She stars as a mother attempting to find the truth and save her son when threatened by spirits during the Chinese tradition of Ghost Month. It was featured in the 2007 Toronto International Film Festival, but has not yet had a wide theatrical release. However, it was broadcast on Lifetime Movie Network February 2015.  In 2008, King appeared as Lorelei Rox in The Spirit, a live-action film adaptation based on the 1940s newspaper strip The Spirit created by Will Eisner. The role reunited King with Sin City writer Frank Miller, who wrote and directed the film.

Film and television roles (2009–present) 
King was cast as Sarah Palmer in the horror remake My Bloody Valentine 3D, which opened in January 2009. She also appeared in the Star Wars-themed comedy Fanboys; originally set for release in January 2008, the film was postponed when director Kyle Newman received additional funding to shoot new scenes. A dispute between the filmmakers and the film's distributor, the Weinstein Company, over which version of the film to release caused further delays, and the film was ultimately released in early 2009 to poor reviews. In May 2008, King featured in another Newman-directed film, Act I of The Cube, the beginning of an online movie-making contest.

The Pardon, a film based on the true life story of Toni Jo Henry, the only woman to be electrocuted by Louisiana, stars King in the lead role with John Hawkes playing her partner-in-crime. This drama was released in 2013. The Pardon'''s co-producer and writer Sandi Russell says: "Jaime carries this film. She is literally in every scene of the movie and given the subject matter, that is no small task."

The Jim Kouf comedy, A Fork in the Road, has King portraying April Rogers, alongside Daniel Roebuck. She plays Beth in Darren Lynn Bousman's remake of Mother's Day and narrated the movie on Scream Award 2009. King hosts the reality show Scream Queens 2, directed by Biagio Messina and Joke Fincioen on VH1. She appeared in the music video for the song "Bury Me Alive" by the band We Are The Fallen with her husband Kyle Newman.

King worked in the TV series Star Wars: The Clone Wars. She played the role of Aurra Sing in the series Season 1 finale episode "Hostage Crisis" and later the final three episodes of Season 2: "Death Trap", "R2 Come Home", and "Lethal Trackdown" as well as an appearance in Season 3. She played three other characters in addition to Aurra Sing in the series. In the episode "Lightsaber Lost", she voices Cassie Cryar and Muk Muk Monkey. She voices a ticket droid in the episode "Lethal Trackdown".

King appeared in the ABC documentary-style dramedy television series My Generation, which premiered on September 23, 2010. After initial low ratings, ABC pulled the program from broadcast after two episodes.

King also appeared in the music video for The Fray's hit single "Never Say Never".

King played Lemon Breeland in the CW show Hart of Dixie, which premiered on September 26, 2011. She had expressed interest in working in the Dark Knight trilogy, specifically in the role of Catwoman, which was eventually played by Anne Hathaway in The Dark Knight Rises in 2012.

King appeared in Lana Del Rey's music video, "Summertime Sadness", which was directed by her husband, Kyle Newman. The video was released in July 2012 and can be seen on YouTube.com. In the video, King plays Del Rey's suicidal lover. King reprised her role as twins Goldie and Wendy in the part sequel and part prequel of the Miller written and co-directed film Sin City: A Dame to Kill For.

 Personal life 
During her first job modeling, King began using heroin and had an addiction to the drug from age 14 to 19, at which time she went to rehabilitation for her addiction. Her boyfriend, 20-year-old fashion photographer Davide Sorrenti, died from "a kidney ailment ." She briefly dated Kid Rock at the age of 21.

In January 2005, while working on the set of Fanboys, she met future husband Kyle Newman, the film's director. Within three months of dating, the two moved in together. Newman proposed in spring 2007, and the two married on November 23, 2007, in an "intimate and relaxed" ceremony in Los Angeles at Greystone Mansion, where Newman had proposed. King told InStyle'' magazine, "I want at least three children." On May 3, 2013, it was announced that King and her husband were expecting their first child. Their son was born in October 2013.

In 2014, she revealed her struggles with endometriosis and polycystic ovary syndrome, which led to infertility. King suffered five miscarriages and an ectopic pregnancy prior to her first successful pregnancy.

In February 2015, King announced she was pregnant with the couple's second son. He was born on July 16 of that year. Taylor Swift is his godmother. 

In May 2020, King filed for divorce from Newman after 13 years of marriage. King also filed a domestic violence prevention petition and was granted a temporary restraining order against Newman.

Filmography

Awards and nominations

References

External links 

 
 

21st-century American actresses
Actresses from Omaha, Nebraska
American child models
Female models from Nebraska
American film actresses
American television actresses
Living people
University of Nebraska–Lincoln alumni
1979 births
People with Endometriosis